Karina Smigla-Bobinski (1967) is a German-Polish intermedia artist, working primarily in new media art and digital art, based in Berlin and Munich.Her work bridges kinetic art, drawing, video, installation, painting, performance and sculpture. Her works have been exhibited in Europe, Asia, North America and South America. One of her major works is ADA, a large, interactive  kinetic sculpture and drawing machine.

Life and education 
Smigla-Bobinski studied art and visual communication at the Academy of Fine Arts in Kraków, Poland and the Academy of Fine Arts, Munich, Germany and graduated as a master student of Gerhard Berger in 2000.

Career
Smigla-Bobinski's work has been shown in galleries and museums including Grande halle de la Villette Museum Paris; and the Nottingham Castle Museum and Art Gallery where her work was exhibited in correlation with Leonardo da Vinci: 10 Drawings from the Royal Collection.

One of her major works is ADA - analog interactive installation, a large kinetic sculpture and drawing machine.  Her interactive installation Simulacra engages viewers to discover hidden images displayed on video screens by using magnifying glasses.

Her work has been written about in The Atlantic, Wired, TANZ Magazine, Imperica, Le Journal de Québec, Business Insider, The Vancouver Sun, e-flux, and Calgary Herald.

In 2016 she was a Visiting Research Fellow and Artist in Residence at ZiF Center for Interdisciplinary Research, Bielefeld, the Bielefeld University’s Institute for Advanced Study, a cultural institution that supports collaborations and dialogue between the arts and sciences.

Literature
 "OVERS!ZE - The Mega Art & Installations“. Victionary (May 2013), 216 pages, .
 "highlike book“, FILE and SESI (October 2014),  584 pages   .
 "T.R.I.B.E. – Exercises in Transitory Art (MoTA Editions # 2)", MoTA (March 2014)
 "Tanz Magazine“ - Der Theaterverlag – Friedrich Berlin GmbH (Januar 2016) .
 "Baumgartens Erfindung der Ästehtik“, Ursula Franke, Reihe „KunstPhilosophie“, Mentis Verlag (2018) .
 "New Media Installation: Technology in Art", Gingko Press (2018)  .
 "The New York Times“ (Januar 2019) .

Exhibitions 
Her works have been shown at museums galleries and festivals, including:

 Bangkok University Gallery in Bangkok, Thailand
 Künstlerinnen und Künstler (BBK Gallery) in Munich, Germany
 Busan Biennale in Busan, Korea
 Centre for Fine Arts (Bozar) in Brussels, Belgium
 CURRENTS New Media Festival, 2015
 Electronic Language International Festival (FILE) in São Paulo and Rio de Janeiro, Brazil
 Foundation for Art and Creative Technology (FACT) in Liverpool, England
 Garage Museum of Contemporary Art in Moscow, Russia
 Grande halle de la Villette in Paris, France
 The Lowry in Manchester, England
 Maison des Arts de Créteil in Paris, France
 Mattress Factory in Pittsburgh, USA
 Microwave International New Media Arts Festival in Hong Kong, China
 The Mois Multi festival, Quebec
 Museum of Transitory Art (MoTA) in Ljubljana, Slovenia
 New Media Gallery in New Westminster, BC, Canada
 Nottingham Castle Museum & Art Gallery in Nottingham, England
 Olympiapark in Munich, Germany
 Patricia and Phillip Frost Museum of Science in Miami, USA
 Science Gallery in Dublin, Ireland
 Singapore Art Museum in Singapore
 Staatstheater am Gärtnerplatz in Munich, Germany
 Suwon IPARK in Korea
 WRO Media Art Biennale in Wroclaw, Poland
 ZERO1 Biennial in Silicon Valley, USA

References

External links 
 Biography on Porto Polonica

1967 births
Living people
Artists from Szczecin
Polish emigrants to Germany
Polish installation artists
Polish performance artists
Jan Matejko Academy of Fine Arts alumni
Academy of Fine Arts, Munich alumni
Polish sculptors
20th-century Polish women artists
21st-century Polish women artists